Asit Kumar Saha (born 1950) is a former National level wrestler. He is now a wrestling coach in the State of West Bengal, India and the General Secretary of West Bengal Wrestling Association. Asit was trained by his father Sudhir Saha, International coach, from a very young age at Panchanan Bayam Samity, Kolkata. Asit was a State Champion from (1965-1973) in both Freestyle and Greco-Roman wrestling.  He won the bronze medal in the Senior National Wrestling Championship, 1969. 
In 1978, he obtained his International FILA wrestling coaching license from Iran. Asit managed the Indian wrestling team for the 1982 Asian Games held in Delhi. India won 1 gold, 1 silver and 3 bronze medals. Asit also managed the Indian Wrestling team at the 1987 South Asian Games held in Kolkata, India. India won 7 out of 9 gold medals in the Championship. Further to this, he has managed the Indian wrestling team in several International Championships including World Championship. In 1987, Asit obtained his FILA Judge-Referee license at the Asian Wrestling Championships in Mumbai.

Below is a list of some of his achievements.

Currently, Asit Kumar Saha holds the following positions listed below - 
 General Secretary, West Bengal Wrestling Association 
 Vice President, Wrestling Federation of India
 Vice President, Bengal Olympic Association

Asit started Women's Wrestling in West Bengal. His trainee Runu Ghoroi is the first National Institute of Sports wrestling coach in the State of West Bengal. In the Bangla - Bangladesh tournament 2011 held at Barasaat, West Bengal won 6 out of 8 gold medals in women's wrestling. Under his leadership, the 58th Senior National Wrestling Championship was held in Kolkata, India from 14 - 17 Nov 2013 at the Netaji Indoor Stadium after 75 years.

References

Indian wrestling coaches
Sport wrestlers from Kolkata
Indian sports coaches